This is a list of the lists of fungal taxa as recorded from South Africa. Names given are as provided by the source, but authorities and dates should be aligned with current practice where feasible. Currently accepted names have been appended where the listed name is out of date.

A fungus (plural: fungi or funguses) is any member of the group of eukaryotic organisms that includes microorganisms such as yeasts and molds, as well as the more familiar mushrooms. These organisms are classified as a kingdom, separately from the other eukaryotic kingdoms, those being Plantae, Animalia, Protozoa, and Chromista.

A characteristic that places fungi in a different kingdom from plants, bacteria, and some protists is chitin in their cell walls. Fungi, like animals, are heterotrophs; they acquire their food by absorbing dissolved molecules, typically by secreting digestive enzymes into their environment. Fungi do not photosynthesize. Growth is their means of mobility, except for spores (a few of which are flagellated), which may travel through the air or water. Fungi are the principal decomposers in ecological systems. These and other differences place fungi in a single group of related organisms, named the Eumycota (true fungi or Eumycetes), which share a common ancestor (from a monophyletic group), an interpretation that is also strongly supported by molecular phylogenetics. This fungal group is distinct from the structurally similar myxomycetes (slime molds) and oomycetes (water molds). The discipline of biology devoted to the study of fungi is known as mycology (from the Greek μύκης , mushroom). In the past, mycology was regarded as a branch of botany, although it is now known fungi are genetically more closely related to animals than to plants.

Abundant worldwide, most fungi are inconspicuous because of the small size of their structures, and their cryptic lifestyles in soil or on dead matter. Fungi include symbionts of plants, animals, or other fungi and also parasites. They may become noticeable when fruiting, either as mushrooms or as molds. Fungi perform an essential role in the decomposition of organic matter and have fundamental roles in nutrient cycling and exchange in the environment. They have long been used as a direct source of human food, in the form of mushrooms and truffles; as a leavening agent for bread; and in the fermentation of various food products, such as wine, beer, and soy sauce. Since the 1940s, fungi have been used for the production of antibiotics, and, more recently, various enzymes produced by fungi are used industrially and in detergents. Fungi are also used as biological pesticides to control weeds, plant diseases and insect pests. Many species produce bioactive compounds called mycotoxins, such as alkaloids and polyketides, that are toxic to animals including humans. The fruiting structures of a few species contain psychotropic compounds and are consumed recreationally or in traditional spiritual ceremonies. Fungi can break down manufactured materials and buildings, and become significant pathogens of humans and other animals. Losses of crops due to fungal diseases (e.g., rice blast disease) or food spoilage can have a large impact on human food supplies and local economies.

The fungus kingdom encompasses an enormous diversity of taxa with varied ecologies, life cycle strategies, and morphologies ranging from unicellular aquatic chytrids to large mushrooms. However, little is known of the true biodiversity of Kingdom Fungi, which has been estimated at 2.2 million to 3.8 million species. Of these, only about 148,000 have been described, with over 8,000 species known to be detrimental to plants and at least 300 that can be pathogenic to humans. Ever since the pioneering 18th and 19th century taxonomical works of Carl Linnaeus, Christiaan Hendrik Persoon, and Elias Magnus Fries, fungi have been classified according to their morphology (e.g., characteristics such as spore color or microscopic features) or physiology. Advances in molecular genetics have opened the way for DNA analysis to be incorporated into taxonomy, which has sometimes challenged the historical groupings based on morphology and other traits. Phylogenetic studies published in the first decade of the 21st century have helped reshape the classification within Kingdom Fungi, which is divided into one subkingdom, seven phyla, and ten subphyla.

A

B

C

D

E

F

G

H

I

K

Genus: Kalchbrennera Berk. 1876, accepted as Lysurus Fr., (1823)
Kalchbrennera corallocephala (Welw. & Curr.) Kalchbr. 1880 accepted as Lysurus corallocephalus Welw. & Curr., (1868)
Kalchbrennera tuckii Berk. 1876
Kalchbrennera tuckii var. microcephala Pole Evans*

Genus: Kloeckerospora*
Kloeckerospora uvarum Niehaus*

Genus: Kretzschmaria Fr. 1849
Kretzschmaria cetrarioides (Welw. & Curr.) Sacc. 1883
Kretzschmaria knysnana Van der Byl 1932
Kretzschmaria micropus (Fr.) Sacc. 1882

Genus: Kuehneola Magnus 1898
Kuehneola albida (J.G.Kühn) Magnus (1898), accepted as Kuehneola uredinis (Link) Arthur (1906)
Kuehneola fici (Castagne) E.J. Butler 1914 accepted as Cerotelium fici (Castagne) Arthur, (1917)
Kuehneola uredinis (Link) Arthur (1906) recorded as Kuehneola albida (J.G.Kühn) Magnus (1898), 

Genus: Kupsura Lloyd 1924, accepted as Lysurus Fr., (1823)
Kupsura sphaerocephala Lloyd 1924

L

M

N

Genus: Naemacyclus Fuckel 1874
Naemacyclus niveus (Pers.) Fuckel ex Sacc. 1884 accepted as Cyclaneusma niveum (Pers.) DiCosmo, Peredo & Minter, (1983)

Genus: Naevia Fr. 1824, accepted as Arthonia Ach., (1806)
Naevia rotundata Vain. 1901

Genus: Naucoria (Fr.) P.Kumm. (1871), accepted as Alnicola Kühner (1926)
Naucoria arenicola (Berk.) Sacc. 1887 accepted as Agrocybe pediades (Fr.) Fayod, (1889)
Naucoria arvalis Quel.(sic) possibly (Fr.) Sacc. 1887, accepted as Agrocybe arvalis (Fr.) Singer, (1936)
Naucoria furfuracea Quel. (sic) possibly (Pers.) P. Kumm. 1871, accepted as Tubaria furfuracea (Pers.) Gillet, [1878]
Naucoria pediades Quel. (sic) possibly (Fr.) P. Kumm. 1871, accepted as Agrocybe pediades (Fr.) Fayod, (1889)
Naucoria pediades var. obscuripes Fayod 1890 accepted as Agrocybe pediades (Fr.) Fayod, (1889)
Naucoria pygmaea (Bull.) Gillet 1876 accepted as Psathyrella pygmaea (Bull.) Singer, (1951)
Naucoria russa (Cooke & Massee) Sacc. 1887
Naucoria scolecina (Fr.) Quél. 1875
Naucoria semiorbicularis (Bull.) Quél. 1875 accepted as Agrocybe pediades (Fr.) Fayod, (1889)
Naucoria undulosa (Fr.) Sacc. 1887

Genus: Nectria (Fr.) Fr. 1849
Nectria cinnabarina (Tode) Fr. 1849
Nectria coccinea (Pers.) Fr. 1849
Nectria coccophila (Tul. & C. Tul.) Wollenw. & Reinking 1935 accepted as Cosmospora flammea (Berk. & Ravenel) Rossman & Samuels, (1999)
Nectria ditissima Tul. & C. Tul. (1865), accepted as Neonectria ditissima (Tul. & C. Tul.) Samuels & Rossman (2006)
Nectria episphaeria  (Tode) Fr. 1849, accepted as Dialonectria episphaeria (Tode) Cooke [as episphærica], (1884)
Nectria eximia Kalchbr. & Cooke 1880
Nectria furfuracea Kalchbr. & Cooke 1880
Nectria galligena Bres. 1901 [as gallingena] accepted as Neonectria ditissima (Tul. & C. Tul.) Samuels & Rossman, (2006)
Nectria heterosperma Kalchbr. & Cooke 1880
Nectria leocarpoides Kalchbr. & Cooke 1880
Nectria martialis Kalchbr. & Cooke 1880
Nectria meliolopsidicola Henn. 1895 [as mellopsicola] accepted as Cosmospora meliolopsidicola (Henn.) Rossman & Samuels [as 'meliopsicola'], (1999)
Nectria perpusilla Sacc. 1913, Nom. illegit.
Nectria peziza (Tode) Fr. 1849
Nectria sp.

Family:Nectrioidaceae Sacc. 1884

Genus: Nematospora Peglion 1897
Nematospora coryli Peglion, 1901, accepted as Eremothecium coryli Kurtzman, 1995
Nematospora gossypii Ashby & Nowell (1926), accepted as Eremothecium gossypii Kurtzman, 1995

Genus: Nematostigma Syd. & P. Syd. 1913
Nematostigma obducens Syd. & P. Syd. 1913,

Genus: Neobarclaya Kuntze 1898
Neobarclaya congesta (Berk. & Broome) Petch 1924 accepted as Deshpandiella jambolana (T.S. Ramakr., Sriniv. & Sundaram) Kamat & Ullasa, (1973)
Neobarclaya natalensis P. Syd. 1899 accepted as Deshpandiella jambolana (T.S. Ramakr., Sriniv. & Sundaram) Kamat & Ullasa, (1973)

Genus: Neocosmospora E.F. Sm. 1899 accepted as Fusarium Link, (1809)
Neocosmospora vasinfecta E.F. Sm. 1899 accepted as Fusarium neocosmosporiellum O'Donnell & Geiser, (2013)
Neocosmospora vasinifecta var. tracheiphila E.F. Sm. 1899  accepted as Fusarium neocosmosporiellum O'Donnell & Geiser, (2013)

Genus: Neopeckia Sacc. 1883
Neopeckia caesalpiniae Doidge 1948 accepted as Herpotrichia caesalpiniae (Doidge) Sivan., (1972) 
Neopeckia rhodostoma Syd. & P. Syd. 1917

Genus: Nephroma Ach. 1809(Lichens)
Nephroma africanum Gyeln. 1931
Nephroma capense A. Massal. 1861
Nephroma cellulosum (Sm.) Ach. 1810
Nephroma flavireagens Gyeln. 1931
Nephroma helveticum Ach. 1810
Nephroma laevigatum Ach. 1814
Nephroma resupinatum f. helveticum Rabenh. 1845
Nephroma tropicum (Müll. Arg.) Zahlbr. 1925

Genus: Nephromium Nyl. 1860, accepted as Nephroma Ach., (1809)
Nephromium helveticum (Ach.) Nyl. 1888 accepted as Nephroma helveticum Ach. [as helvetica], (1810)
Nephromium tropicum Müll. Arg. 1883
Nephromium laevigatum (Ach.) Nyl. 1858 accepted as Nephroma laevigatum Ach. [as laevigata], (1814)

Genus: Nesolechia A. Massal. 1856 accepted as Phacopsis Tul., (1852)
Nesolechia perforans (Stizenb.) Vouaux 1913;

Family: Nidulariaceae Dumort. 1822

Genus: Nidularia Fr. 1817
Nidularia dasypus (Nees) Fr. 1823

Genus: Nigrospora Zimm. 1902
Nigrospora oryzae (Berk. & Broome) Petch (1924), 
Nigrospora panici Zimm. 1902
Nigrospora sphaerica (Sacc.) E.W. Mason 1927 accepted as Nigrospora oryzae (Berk. & Broome) Petch (1924)

Genus: Niopsora A. Massal. 1861, accepted as Caloplaca Th. Fr., (1860)
Niopsora ecklonii A. Massal. 1861

Genus: Niorma A. Massal. 1861
Niorma derelicta A. Massal. 1861

Genus: Nolanea (Fr.) P. Kumm. 1871
Nolanea casta (MacOwan) Sacc. 1887 accepted as Mycena casta (MacOwan) D.A. Reid, (1975)
Nolanea leuciscus Kalchbr.*

Genus: Normandina Nyl. 1855
Normandina pulchella (Borrer) Nyl. 1861

Genus: Nummularia Tul. & C. Tul. 1863 accepted as Biscogniauxia Kuntze, (1891)
Nummularia clypeus (Schwein.) Cooke 1883 accepted as Biscogniauxia mediterranea (De Not.) Kuntze, (1891)
Nummularia kalchbrenneri (Sacc.) J.H. Mill. 1942, accepted as Biscogniauxia kalchbrenneri (Sacc.) Y.M. Ju & J.D. Rogers, (1998)
Nummularia lepida Syd. 1924 accepted as Biscogniauxia kalchbrenneri (Sacc.) Y.M. Ju & J.D. Rogers, (1998)
Nummularia placenta Cooke accepted as Biscogniauxia kalchbrenneri (Sacc.) Y.M. Ju & J.D. Rogers, (1998) 
Nummularia punctulata (Berk. & Ravenel) Sacc. 1882 [as punctulatum] accepted as Camillea punctulata (Berk. & Ravenel) Læssøe, J.D. Rogers & Whalley, (1989)
Nummularia suborbicularis  (Welw. & Curr.) Sacc. 1882, [as suborbiculare] 
Nummularia uniapiculata Penz. & Sacc. [as uni-apiculata], (1898) accepted as Biscogniauxia uniapiculata (Penz. & Sacc.) Whalley & Læssøe, (1990)

O

Oc
Genus: Ocellularia G. Mey. 1825 (Lichens)
Ocellularia capensis var. feracior Zahlbr. 1932
Ocellularia capensis var. leiothallina Zahlbr. 1932 
Ocellularia cavata (Ach.) Müll. Arg. 1882
Ocellularia diploschistoides Zahlbr. 1932 
Ocellularia galactina Zahlbr. 1932 
Ocellularia henatomma (Ach.) Müll. Arg. 1887

Genus: Ochrolechia A.Massal. (1852) (Lichens)
Ochrolechia africana Vain. 1926
Ochrolechia africana Vain. 1926 
Ochrolechia pallescens (L.) A. Massal. 1853
Ochrolechia parella (L.) A. Massal. 1852

Genus: Octaviania Vittad. 1831
Octaviania africana  Lloyd 1922 accepted as Neosecotium africanum (Lloyd) Singer & A.H. Sm., (1960)
Octaviania carnea (Wallr.) Corda 1854 accepted as Hydnangium carneum Wallr., (1839) 
Octaviania flava G.H.Cunn. accepted as Stephanospora flava (Rodway) G.W. Beaton, Pegler & T.W.K. Young, (1985)

Od
Genus: Odontia Pers. 1794
Odontia arguta (Fr.) Quél. 1888 accepted as Hyphodontia arguta (Fr.) J. Erikss., (1958)
Odontia knysnana Van der Byl 1934 accepted as Xylodon knysnanus (Van der Byl) Hjortstam & Ryvarden, (2009)
Odontia saccharicola Burt 1917 accepted as Resinicium saccharicola (Burt) Nakasone, (2000)

Oi
Genus: Oidiopsis Scalia 1902 accepted as Leveillula G. Arnaud, (1921)
Oidiopsis taurica  (Lév.) E.S. Salmon 1906 accepted as Leveillula taurica (Lév.) G. Arnaud, (1921)

Genus: Oidium Link 1824
Oidium abelmoschi Thüm. 1878 accepted as Fibroidium abelmoschi (Thüm.) U. Braun & R.T.A. Cook, (2012)
Oidium chrysanthemi Rabenh. 1853 accepted as Golovinomyces chrysanthemi (Rabenh.) M. Bradshaw, U. Braun, Meeboon & S. Takam., (2017)
Oidium erysiphoides Fr. (1832), accepted as Golovinomyces biocellatus (Ehrenb.) V.P. Heluta, (1988)
Oidium farinosum Cooke (1887), accepted as Podosphaera leucotricha (Ellis & Everh.) E.S. Salmon, (1900)
Oidium hortensiae Jørst. 1925 accepted as Pseudoidium hortensiae (Jørst. ex S. Blumer) U. Braun & R.T.A. Cook, (2012)
Oidium lactis Fresen. 1850 accepted as Dipodascus geotrichum (E.E. Butler & L.J. Petersen) Arx, (1977)
Oidium leuconium Desm. 1829 accepted as Podosphaera pannosa (Wallr.) de Bary, (1870)
Oidium lycopersici Cooke & Massee, (1888) [as lycopersicum] accepted as Golovinomyces lycopersici (Cooke & Massee) L. Kiss, (2019)
Oidium mangiferae Berthet 1914
Oidium quercinum Thüm. 1878 accepted as Erysiphe alphitoides (Griffon & Maubl.) U. Braun & S. Takam., (2000)
Oidium tabaci Thüm. 1879 accepted as Golovinomyces cichoracearum (DC.) V.P. Heluta [as 'cichoraceorum'], (1988)
Oidium tuckeri Berk. 1847 accepted as Erysiphe necator Schwein., [1834]
Oidium verbenae Thüm. & P.C. Bolle 1885 accepted as Acrosporium verbenae (Thüm. & P.C. Bolle) J.A. Stev., (1975)
Oidium sp.

Ol
Genus: Olpidiopsis Cornu 1872
Olpidiopsis ricciae  du Plessis 1933
 
Genus: Oligostroma Syd. & P. Syd. 1914 accepted as Ramularia Unger, (1833)
Oligostroma maculiformis (G. Winter) Doidge 1921 accepted as Teratosphaeria maculiformis (G. Winter) Joanne E. Taylor & Crous, (1999)
Oligostroma proteae Syd. & P. Syd. 1914 accepted as Mycosphaerella proteae (Syd. & P. Syd.) Arx, (1962)

Om
Genus: Ombrophila Fr. 1849
Ombrophila nigrescens Henn. 1902
 
Genus: Omphalia (Fr.) Gray 1821, accepted as Omphalina Quél., (1886)
Omphalia bulbosa Bres. 1920
Omphalia glaucophylla Gill. (sic) possibly (Lasch) Sacc. 1887
Omphalia griseopallida Quel.(sic) possibly (Desm.) P. Karst. 1879 accepted as Arrhenia griseopallida (Desm.) Watling, [1988]
Omphalia integrella Quel. (sic) possibly (Pers.) P. Kumm. 1871 accepted as Delicatula integrella (Pers.) Fayod, (1889)
Omphalia linopus (Kalchbr.) Sacc. 1887
Omphalia micromeles (Berk. & Broome) Sacc. 1887
Omphalia oniscus (Fr.) Gillet 1876 accepted as Arrhenia oniscus (Fr.) Redhead, Lutzoni, Moncalvo & Vilgalys [as onisca], (2002)
Omphalia pallescens Bres. 1920 accepted as Clitocybe torrendii Pegler, (1966)
Omphalia paurophylla (Berk.) Sacc. 1891
Omphalia polypus (Kalchbr.) Sacc. 1887 accepted as Marasmius polypus (Kalchbr.) D.A. Reid, (1975)
Omphalia rustica (Fr.) Quél. 1872, accepted as Arrhenia rustica (Fr.) Redhead, Lutzoni, Moncalvo & Vilgalys, (2002)
Omphalia scyphoides Quel. (sic) possibly (Fr.) P. Kumm. 1871, accepted as Clitopilus scyphoides (Fr.) Singer, (1946)
Omphalia syndesmia (Kalchbr.) Sacc. 1887;
Omphalia umbellifera Quel. var. cinnabarina Berk.*

Genus: Omphalaria Durieu & Mont. 1847 (?) accepted as Thyrea A. Massal., (1856)
Omphalaria minuscula (Nyl.) Vain. 1901
 
Genus: Omphalodium Meyen & Flot. 1843 (?) (Lichens)
Omphalodium hottentottum (Ach.) Flot. 1843 accepted as Xanthoparmelia hottentotta (Ach.) A. Thell, Feuerer, Elix & Kärnefelt, J. Hattori (2006)
Omphalodium hottentottum var. phalacrum Hue 1900
Omphalodium mutabile (Taylor) Minks 1900;

On
Genus: Oncospora Kalchbr. 1880
Oncospora bullata Kalchbr. & Cooke 1880
Oncospora viridans Kalchbr. & Cooke 1880

Oo
Genus: Oospora Wallr. 1833, accepted as Oidium Link, (1824)
Oospora citri-aurantii (Ferraris) Sacc. & P. Syd. 1902accepted as Dipodascus geotrichum (E.E. Butler & L.J. Petersen) Arx, 336 (1977)
Oospora fimicola (Costantin & Matr.) Cub. & Megliola 1903, accepted as Scopulariopsis coprophila (Cooke & Massee) W. Gams, (1971)
Oospora fusidium (Thüm.) Sacc. & Voglino 1886
Oospora lactis (Fresen.) Sacc. 1886 accepted as Dipodascus geotrichum (E.E. Butler & L.J. Petersen) Arx, (1977)
Oospora pustulans M.N. Owen & Wakef. 1919 [as pustularis] accepted as Polyscytalum pustulans (M.N. Owen & Wakef.) M.B. Ellis, (1976)
Oospora scabies Thaxt. 1892

Genus: Oothecium Speg. 1918, accepted as Asterostomella Speg., (1886)
Oothecium consimile Syd. 1930
Oothecium macarangae Petr. 1928 accepted as Capnodiastrum macarangae (Petr.) Petr., (1952)
Oothecium stylosporum (Cooke) Doidge 1942 accepted as Capnodiastrum stylosporum (Cooke) Petr.,  (1952)

Op
Genus: Opegrapha (Lichens)
Opegrapha adpicta Zahlbr. 1932
Opegrapha agelaea Fée 1837
Opegrapha atra Pers. 1794 accepted as Arthonia atra (Pers.) A. Schneid., (1898)
Opegrapha bacillosa Zahlbr. 1936
Opegrapha bonplandi Fée 1825
Opegrapha capensis Müll. Arg. 1888
Opegrapha diagraphoides Nyl. 1869
Opegrapha diaphorella Stizenb. 1891
Opegrapha emersa Müll. Arg. 1887 accepted as Lecanographa lyncea (Sm.) Egea & Torrente, (1994)
Opegrapha exiguella Zahlbr. 1936 [as exigualla]
Opegrapha exornata Zahlbr.
Opegrapha interalbata Nyl. 1867
Opegrapha lactifera Zahlbr. 1936
Opegrapha lyncea (Sm.) Borrer ex Hook. 1833 accepted as Lecanographa lyncea (Sm.) Egea & Torrente, (1994)
Opegrapha medusulina Nyl. 1895
Opegrapha menyharthii Müll. Arg. 1893
Opegrapha parvula Nyl. 1876
Opegrapha prosodea var. microcarpella Zahlbr. 1936
Opegrapha quaternella Nyl. f. congesta Stizenb.*
Opegrapha scripta (L.) Ach. 1803 accepted as Graphis scripta (L.) Ach., (1809)
Opegrapha semiatra Müll. Arg. 1886
Opegrapha signatella Vain. 1926
Opegrapha tapetica Zahlbr. 1932.
Opegrapha ulcerata Müll. Arg. 1895
Opegrapha zanei A. Massal. 1861
 
Genus: Ophiobolus Riess 1854
Ophiobolus cariceti (Berk. & Broome) Sacc. (1883), accepted as Gaeumannomyces graminis var. graminis (Sacc.) Arx & D.L. Olivier, (1952)
Ophiobolus graminis (Sacc.) Sacc. (1881), accepted as Gaeumannomyces graminis var. graminis (Sacc.) Arx & D.L. Olivier, (1952)
Ophiobolus cariceti (Berk. & Broome) Sacc. 1883, accepted as Gaeumannomyces graminis (Sacc.) Arx & D.L. Olivier, (1952)
Ophiobolus stipae Doidge 1941
Ophiobolus urticae (Rabenh.) Sacc. 1883 accepted as Pseudoophiobolus erythrosporus (Riess) Phookamsak, Wanas., & K.D. Hyde, (2017)

Genus: Ophiodothella (Henn.) Höhn. 1910
Ophiodothella edax (Berk. & Broome) Höhn. 1910
Ophiodothella liebenbergii Doidge 1942

Or
Genus: Orbilia Fr. 1836
Orbilia rubella (Pers.) P. Karst. 1871
Orbilia xanthostigma (Fr.) Fr. 1849

Family: Orbiliaceae Nannf. 1932

Ot
Genus: Otthia Nitschke ex Fuckel 1870
Otthia deformans Pat. 1918

Ov
Genus: Ovularia Sacc. 1880, accepted as Ramularia Unger, (1833)
Ovularia bistorta (Fuckel) Sacc. 1886 accepted as Ramularia bistortae Fuckel, (1870)
Ovularia lolii Volkart 1903 accepted as Ramularia lolii (Volkart) U. Braun, (1988)
 
Genus: OvulariopsisPat. & Har. 1900 
Ovulariopsis moricola Delacr. 1903
Ovulariopsis papayae  Van der Byl 1921 accepted as Phyllactinia papayae (Van der Byl) U. Braun, (2016)
Ovulariopsis sp.

P

R

S

T

U

V

Va
Genus: Valsa
Valsa infinitissima Kalchbr. & Cooke 1880 accepted as Peroneutypella infinitissima (Kalchbr. & Cooke) Doidge, (1941)
Valsa leucostoma (Pers.) Fr. 1849 accepted as Cytospora leucostoma (Pers.) Sacc., (1881) 
Valsa salicina (Pers.) Fr. 1849
Valsa sordida Nitschke 1870 accepted as Cytospora chrysosperma (Pers.) Fr., (1823)
Valsa stellulata (Fr.) Fr. 1849 accepted as Eutypella stellulata (Fr.) Sacc., (1882)

Family: Valsaceae Tul. & C. Tul. 1861

Genus: Valsaria Ces. & De Not. 1863
Valsaria batesii Doidge, (1948), accepted as Valsaria insitiva (Tode) Ces. & De Not.,(1863)
Valsaria eucalypti (Kalchbr. & Cooke) Sacc. 1882, accepted as Myrmaecium rubricosum (Fr.) Fuckel, (1870)
Valsaria natalensis Doidge 1941

Family: Valseae

Genus: Varicellaria Nyl. 1858
Varicellaria lactea (L.) I. Schmitt & Lumbsch, (2012) recorded as Variolaria lactea Wahlbg. (sic) possibly (L.) Pers. 1794

Genus: Variolaria
Variolaria discoidea Pers. 1794 accepted as Lepra albescens (Huds.) Hafellner, (2016)
Variolaria lactea Wahlbg. (sic) possibly (L.) Pers. 1794, accepted as Varicellaria lactea (L.) I. Schmitt & Lumbsch, (2012)

Ve
Genus: Venturia
Venturia cephalariae (Auersw.) Kalchbr. & Cooke 1880
Venturia inaequalis (Cooke) G. Winter 1875
Venturia pyrina Aderh. (1896), 

Genus: Vermicularia Tode 1790 accepted as Colletotrichum Corda, (1831)
Vermicularia capsici Syd., (1913), accepted as Colletotrichum capsici (Syd.) E.J. Butler & Bisby, (1931)
Vermicularia dematium  (Pers.) Fr., (1829), accepted as Colletotrichum dematium (Pers.) Grove, (1918)
Vermicularia dianthi  Westend. (1867), accepted as Colletotrichum dematium (Pers.) Grove, (1918)
Vermicularia herbarum Westend. 1849
Vermicularia herbarum f. dianthi West. (sic) possibly var. dianthi (Westend.) Sacc. 1931 accepted as Colletotrichum dematium (Pers.) Grove, (1918)
Vermicularia varians Ducomet 1908

Genus: Verrucaria Schrad. 1794? (Lichens)
Verrucaria alba (Müll. Arg.) Stizenb. 1891
Verrucaria albella (Müll. Arg.) Stizenb. 1891
Verrucaria alboatra Kremp. 1867
Verrucaria alboatra var. recepta (Müll. Arg.) Stizenb. 1891
Verrucaria aspistea Afzel. ex Ach. 1803 accepted as Pyrenula aspistea (Afzel. ex Ach.) Ach., (1814)
Verrucaria cinchonae Ach. 1814 accepted as Constrictolumina cinchonae (Ach.) Lücking, M.P. Nelsen & Aptroot, (2016)
Verrucaria cinchonae var. fumida Stizenb. 1891
Verrucaria clopima Wahlenb. 1809 accepted as Staurothele clopima (Wahlenb.) Th. Fr., (1861) 
Verrucaria confluxa (Müll. Arg.) Stizenb. 1891 accepted as Bogoriella confluens (Müll. Arg.) Aptroot & Lücking, (2016)
Verrucaria dissipans Nyl. 1866
Verrucaria erodens Müll. Arg. 1888
Verrucaria eurysperma Stizenb. 1891
Verrucaria fallax (Nyl.) Nyl. 1872 accepted as Pseudosagedia fallax (Nyl.) Oxner, (1956)
Verrucaria ferruginosa (Müll. Arg.) Stizenb. 1891 accepted as Pyrenowilmsia ferruginosa (Müll. Arg.) Aptroot, (1991)
Verrucaria glabrata var. incusa Flot. 1843
Verrucaria leucanthes Stirt. 1877
Verrucaria locuples Stizenb. 1891 accepted as Clathroporina locuples (Stizenb.) Zahlbr., (1922)
Verrucaria microlepidea Zahlbr. 1932
Verrucaria mierolepidea var. hilarior Zahlbr. 1932.
Verrucaria nigrescens Pers. 1795
Verrucaria nitida (Weigel) Schrad. 1801 accepted as Pyrenula nitida (Weigel) Ach., (1814)
Verrucaria nitida var. nitidella Flörke 1815 accepted as Pyrenula nitida (Weigel) Ach., (1814)
Verrucaria papulosa Nyl. 1867 accepted as Astrothelium papulosum (Nyl.) Aptroot & Lücking, (2016)
Verrucaria pleiomeriza Nyl. 1895
Verrucaria pyrenuloides (Mont.) Nyl. 1858, accepted as Pyrenula pyrenuloides (Mont.) R.C. Harris, (1989)
Verrucaria rebellans Zahlbr. 1936
Verrucaria santensis (Nyl.) Nyl. 1863 accepted as Pyrenula santensis (Nyl.) Müll. Arg., (1882)
Verrucaria simulans (Müll. Arg.) Stizenb. 1891
Verrucaria subducta Nyl. 1863
Verrucaria tetracerae Afzel. (sic)possibly Ach. 1803 accepted as Porina tetracerae (Ach.) Müll. Arg., (1885)
Verrucaria transwaalensis (Müll. Arg.) Stizenb., (1891) [as transvaalensis]]
Verrucaria variolosa Mont. 1845
Verrucaria viridula (Schrad.) Ach. 1803
Verrucaria wilmsiana (Müll. Arg.) Stizenb. 1891
 
Family: Verrucariaceae Eschw. 1824

Genus: Verticillium Nees 1816
Verticillium alboatrum Reinke & Berthold 1879,
Verticillium pulvinulum Kalchbr. & Cooke 1882
Verticillium terrestre (Pers.) Sacc. 1886
Verticillium sp.

Genus: Vestergrenia Rehm 1901
Vestergrenia chaenostoma (Sacc.) Theiss. 1918

Vo
Genus: Volutella Fr. 1832
Volutella dianthi Atk.*
Volutella sp.

Genus: Volvaria
Volvaria bombycina Quel. (sic)possibly (Schaeff.) P. Kumm. 1871, accepted as Volvariella bombycina (Schaeff.) Singer, (1951)
Volvaria eurhiza Petch.*
Volvaria pusilla Quel. (sic) possibly (Pers.) Lloyd 1899, accepted as Volvariella pusilla (Pers.) Singer, (1951)
Volvaria speciosa Gill. (sic) possibly (Fr.) P. Kumm. 1871, accepted as Volvopluteus gloiocephalus (DC.) Vizzini, Contu & Justo, (2011)
Volvaria sp.

Genus: Volvariella Speg. 1898
Volvariella bombycina (Schaeff.) Singer, (1951) recorded as Volvaria bombycina Quel. (sic)possibly (Schaeff.) P. Kumm. 1871
Volvariella pusilla (Pers.) Singer, (1951) recprded as Volvaria pusilla Quel. (sic) possibly (Pers.) Lloyd 1899

Genus: Volvopluteus Vizzini, Contu & Justo 2011
Volvopluteus gloiocephalus (DC.) Vizzini, Contu & Justo, (2011) recorded as Volvaria speciosa Gill. (sic) possibly (Fr.) P. Kumm. 1871

W

Genus: Woodiella Sacc. & P. Syd. 1899,
Woodiella natalensis Sacc. & P. Syd. (1899),
 
Family: Woroninaceae H.E. Petersen 1909

Genus: Woroninella Racib. 1898 accepted as Synchytrium de Bary & Woronin, (1863)
Woroninella dolichi (Cooke) Syd. 1914 accepted as Synchytrium dolichi (Cooke) Gäum., (1927)

X

Xa
Genus: Xanthoria (Fr.) Th. Fr. 1860,(Lichens)
Xanthoria aureola (Ach.) Erichsen, (1930) reported as Xanthoria parietina var. aureola (Ach.) Th. Fr. 1860
Xanthoria candelaria f. fibrillosa Hillmann 1922
Xanthoria candelaria var. semigranularis (Müll. Arg.) Zahlbr. 1931
Xanthoria ectaneoides (Nyl.) Zahlbr. 1931
Xanthoria flammea (L. f.) Hillmann 1922 accepted as Dufourea flammea (L. f.) Ach., (1810)
Xanthoria flammea var. podetiifera Hillmann 1922
Xanthoria marlothii Zahlbr. 1926 accepted as Dufourea marlothii (Zahlbr.) Frödén, Arup & Søchting, (2013)
Xanthoria parietina Beltr. (sic) possibly (L.) Th. Fr. 1860
Xanthoria parietina f. albicans (Müll. Arg.) Hillmann 1961
Xanthoria parietina f. rutilans Th. Fr. 1871
Xanthoria parietina var. aureola (Ach.) Th. Fr. 1860 Accepted as Xanthoria aureola (Ach.) Erichsen, (1930)
Xanthoria parietina var. ectanea (Ach.) J. Kickx f. 1867, accepted as Xanthoria parietina (L.) Th. Fr., (1860)
Xanthoria parietina var. ectaneoides (Nyl.) Zahlbr. 1917 accepted as Xanthoria ectaneoides (Nyl.) Zahlbr. [as 'ectanoides'], (1931)
Xanthoria parietina var. macrophylla (Stizenb.) Hillmann 1920
Xanthoria turbinata Vain. 1900 accepted as Dufourea turbinata (Vain.) Frödén, Arup & Søchting, (2013)

Xe
Genus: Xerotus Fr. 1828
Xerotus berteroi Mont. [as 'berteri'], (1850) 
Xerotus caffrorum Kalchbr. & MacOwan 1881 accepted as Collybia caffrorum (Kalchbr. & MacOwan) D.A. Reid, (1975)
Xerotus fuliginosus Berk. & M.A. Curtis 1860
Xerotus nigritus Lév. 1846 accepted as Anthracophyllum nigritum (Lév.) Kalchbr., (1881)

Xy
Genus: Xylaria Hill ex Schrank 1786
Xylaria allantoidea (Berk.) Fr. 1851
Xylaria anisopleura (Mont.) Fr. 1851
Xylaria apiculata Cooke 1879
Xylaria arbuscula Sacc. 1878
Xylaria aristata Mont. 1856. accepted as Podosordaria aristata (Mont.) P.M.D. Martin, (1976)
Xylaria bulbosa (Pers.) Berk. & Broome 1860
Xylaria capensis (Lév.) Sacc. 1883
Xylaria carpophila Pers. ex Fr.
Xylaria castorea Berk. 1855
Xylaria corniformis (Fr.) Fr. 1849
Xylaria cubensis (Mont.) Fr. 1851
Xylaria digitata (L.) Grev. 1825
Xylaria doumetii (Pat.) J.H. Mill. 1942
Xylaria ensata Kalch.*
Xylaria fistulosa (Lév.) Fr. 1851
Xylaria heloidea Penz. & Sacc. 1898 accepted as Podosordaria heloidea (Penz. & Sacc.) P.M.D. Martin, (1976)
Xylaria hypoxylon (L.) Grev. 1824,
Xylaria ippoglossa Speg. (1889) [as Hippoglossa] 
Xylaria multiplex (Kunze) Fr. 1851
Xylaria myosurus Mont. 1855
Xylaria nigripes (Klotzsch) Cooke 1883, accepted as Podosordaria nigripes (Klotzsch) P.M.D. Martin, (1976)
Xylaria oxyacanthae Tul. & C. Tul. 1863,
Xylaria pistillaris Nitschke*
Xylaria polymorpha (Pers.) Grev. 1824
Xylaria reticulata Lloyd 1925
Xylaria rhopaloides Mont. 1855 (Nom. inval.) accepted as Xylaria rhopaloides Kunze ex Sacc., (1882)
Xylaria schreuderiana Van der Byl 1932
Xylaria schweinitzii Berk. & M.A. Curtis 1854
Xylaria stilboidea Kalchbr. & Cooke 1880
Xylaria tabacina (J. Kickx f.) Berk. 1851
Xylaria vaporaria Berk. 1864
Xylaria variabilis Welw. & Curr. 1868
Xylaria xanthinovelutina (Mont.) Mont. [as 'ianthino-velutina'], (1856)
Xylaria sp.

Family: Xylariaceae Tul. & C. Tul. 1863

Genus: Xylosorium Zundel 1939, accepted as Pericladium Pass., (1875)
Xylosorium piperis Zundel 1939 [as piperii] accepted as Pericladium piperis (Zundel) Mundk. [as 'piperii'], (1944)

Z

Genus: Zukalia Sacc. 1891, accepted as Chaetothyrium Speg., (1888)
Zukalia parenchymatica Doidge 1920, accepted as Ceramothyrium parenchymaticum (Doidge) Bat., (1962)
Zukalia transvaalensis Doidge 1917 accepted as Phaeophragmeriella transvaalensis (Doidge) Hansf., (1946)
Zukalia woodiana Doidge 1920

Genus: Zythia Fr. 1825, accepted as Sarea Fr., (1825)
Zythia welwitschiae Henn. 1903

Family: Zythiaceae Clem. 1909

References

Sources

Further reading

See also
 List of bacteria of South Africa
 List of Oomycetes of South Africa
 List of slime moulds of South Africa

 List of fungi of South Africa
 List of fungi of South Africa – A
 List of fungi of South Africa – B
 List of fungi of South Africa – C
 List of fungi of South Africa – D
 List of fungi of South Africa – E
 List of fungi of South Africa – F
 List of fungi of South Africa – G
 List of fungi of South Africa – H
 List of fungi of South Africa – I
 List of fungi of South Africa – J
 List of fungi of South Africa – K
 List of fungi of South Africa – L
 List of fungi of South Africa – M
 List of fungi of South Africa – N
 List of fungi of South Africa – O
 List of fungi of South Africa – P
 List of fungi of South Africa – Q
 List of fungi of South Africa – R
 List of fungi of South Africa – S
 List of fungi of South Africa – T
 List of fungi of South Africa – U
 List of fungi of South Africa – V
 List of fungi of South Africa – W
 List of fungi of South Africa – X
 List of fungi of South Africa – Y
 List of fungi of South Africa – Z

External links
Name search at Index Fungorum

 

Fungi
Fungi
South Africa